Eulepidotis hermura is a moth of the family Erebidae first described by William Schaus in 1898. It is found in the Neotropics, including Mexico, Costa Rica, Honduras, Venezuela, Peru and Ecuador.

References

Moths described in 1898
hermura